Back Together may refer to:
"Back Together" (song), a 2015 song by Robin Thicke
Back Together (album), a 2019 album by Michael Ball and Alfie Boe
"Back Together", a song by Jesse McCartney from the album In Technicolor (2014)
"Back Together", a song by Citizen Cope from the album Every Waking Moment (2006)